Harran may refer to:

Places

Norway
Harran, Norway, a village in the municipality of Grong in Trøndelag county, Norway
Harran (municipality), a former municipality in the old Nord-Trøndelag county, Norway

Syria
Harran al-Awamid, a town in Rif Dimashq Governorate, southern Syria.
Harran, Idlib, a village in Idlib Governorate, northern Syria
Harran, as-Suwayda, an ancient village in Shahba District, As-Suwayda Governorate, southwestern Syria

Turkey
Harran, a major ancient city in Upper Mesopotamia (in present-day Turkey)

Yemen
Harran, Yemen, a village in west central Yemen

Other
Battle of Harran, a battle in 1104 between crusader states Antioch and Edessa
Harran Sulci, a region on Saturn's moon, Enceladus 
Harran University, a university in Şanlıurfa, Turkey
Fall of Harran, the Babylonian siege and capture of Harran in 608 BC
Harran, the fictional city-state that serves as the setting for the survival horror video game Dying Light.

See also
Haran, the name of three different men mentioned in the Hebrew Bible